Upfor is an American contemporary art gallery based in Portland, Oregon, United States, presenting primary market artworks by early and mid-career artists.

History
The gallery opened in 2013 in its present location at 929 NW Flanders Street in Portland. The gallery also participates in art fairs in the United States. and internationally The gallery was founded by Theo Downes-Le Guin, a former high technology marketing executive with an academic background in art history and sociology, and son of noted science fiction author Ursula K. Le Guin.

Artists
Upfor’s artistic program emphasizes artists who focus on contemporary media culture; exhibited artworks often include a technology or digital component in their making and presentation. Artists that Upfor represents exclusively or in conjunction with other galleries are Brenna Murphy, Ben Buswell, and Rodrigo Valenzuela. Other notable artists who have exhibited at Upfor include Frances Stark, whose feature-length video work My Best Thing was Upfor's inaugural exhibition in 2013 , and artist Ryan Trecartin, who in 2014 screened the video Center Jenny.

References

External links

2013 establishments in Oregon
Art galleries established in 2013
Arts centers in Oregon
Culture of Portland, Oregon
Organizations based in Portland, Oregon